Cassandra's Dream is a 2007 thriller drama film written and directed by Woody Allen. Filmed in the United Kingdom, it was released in 2007 in Europe and in January 2008 in the United States. It was developed as a British-French-American co-production.

The film was premiered in secret at Avilés, Spain, on 18 June 2007. It officially premiered at the Venice Film Festival on 2 September 2007 and was already in theaters in Spain by 3 November. The film had its North American premiere at the Toronto International Film Festival on 11 September 2007.

Plot
Brothers Terry and Ian, who live in South London, were raised by a weak father, Brian, who runs a restaurant, and a strong mother, Dorothy, who taught her sons to look up to their uncle Howard, a successful plastic surgeon and businessman.

The brothers buy a sailboat at an oddly low price, despite its near pristine condition. They name it Cassandra's Dream, after a greyhound that won Terry the money to buy the boat. Knowing nothing of Greek mythology, they are unaware of the ominous antecedents of this name—the ancient prophetess Cassandra, whose prophecies of doom went unheeded by those around her.

While driving home from a day's sailing in a borrowed car, Ian crosses paths with beautiful actress Angela Stark, with whom he becomes infatuated.

Terry has a gambling addiction that sinks him deeper in debt. Ian wishes to invest in hotels in California to finance a new life with Angela.  To overcome their financial problems, they ask Howard for help. He agrees to help them, but asks for a favor in return: they must murder someone for him. Howard faces imprisonment for unspecified crimes and his future is threatened by Martin Burns, a former business partner who plans to testify against him. Howard asks his nephews to get rid of Burns, and in return he will reward them financially. After initial reluctance, the brothers agree.

They make two zip guns, untraceable and easily destroyed. Lying in wait in Burns' home, their plan is foiled when Burns arrives with a woman. Their resolve shaken, they leave and agree to commit the murder the next day.

The next day, they succeed in carrying out the murder and later destroy the guns. Ian is content to move on as if nothing happened, but Terry is consumed by guilt and begins abusing alcohol and other drugs. His behavior frightens his fiancée, who tells Ian about the situation and that Terry believes he has killed someone. After Terry confides that he wants to turn himself in to the police, Ian goes to Howard for advice. They agree there is no alternative but to get rid of Terry. Ian plans to poison Terry during an outing on the boat. Ian can't bring himself to kill his own brother, and attacks him in a fit of rage. In the chaos, Terry knocks Ian down the steps into the cabin, killing him.

The boat is later discovered adrift by the police, who deduce that Terry killed Ian and then drowned himself. The last shot is of Cassandra's Dream, still in beautiful condition despite the tragedies it set in motion.

Cast

Soundtrack

This is the first Woody Allen film since Everything You Always Wanted to Know About Sex* (*But Were Afraid to Ask) to have an original score commissioned for it. The score was composed by Philip Glass.

It was also his first film released with a stereo soundtrack. Allen previously eschewed stereo although often employing Dolby Stereo and Dolby Digital technologies to convey a higher quality mono soundtrack. The film is stereo for its music only.

Critical response
The film received mixed reviews from critics. Review aggregation website Rotten Tomatoes gives the film a score 46% based on reviews from 116 critics. Another aggregator Metacritic gave the film an average rating score of 49 out of 100, based on 31 reviews.

Manohla Dargis commended the film in her review for The New York Times. Although offering criticism such as the film feeling "too lightly polished and often rushed, as if he had directed it with a stopwatch," she suggests that Allen's film "is good enough that you may wonder why he doesn't just stop making comedies once and for all." Roger Ebert compared the film negatively to Sidney Lumet's similarly themed Before the Devil Knows You're Dead, adding: "The Lumet film uses actors who don't look like brothers but feel like brothers. Allen's actors look like brothers but don't really feel related." He rated the film two out of four stars, and noted that Allen's previous film Match Point presented the material more effectively.

Damon Wise of Empire magazine concluded that Cassandra's Dream was "[a] clumsy, clichéd morality play that may actually represent the lowest point of Allen's recently chequered career." Paul Jordan also compared the film to a morality play—but considered that praise: "Allen gets past the guard of a modern audience which would not have taken seriously the appearance of a Mephistopheles or an Old Scratch. Uncle Howard is a chilling 21st Century Tempter, fulfilling the heart's desire in return for murder and leading his nephews to terrible perdition."

In his "Best of the Decade" article, New Yorker critic Richard Brody called Cassandra's Dream one of the best films of the 2000s: "Few aging directors so cogently and relentlessly depict the grimly destructive machinery of life, and every time the word 'family' is uttered, the screws tighten just a little more."

In 2016 film critics Robbie Collin and Tim Robey ranked it as one of the worst movies by Woody Allen.

References

External links
 
 
 
 
 
 DVD Talk discusses Woody Allen's dark side

2007 films
2007 thriller drama films
American neo-noir films
American thriller drama films
Films directed by Woody Allen
Films produced by Gareth Wiley
Films produced by Letty Aronson
Films produced by Stephen Tenenbaum
Films scored by Philip Glass
Films set in London
Films set in Brighton
Films with screenplays by Woody Allen
Fratricide in fiction
French neo-noir films
French thriller drama films
Wild Bunch films
2000s English-language films
2000s American films
2000s French films